Scicluna is a surname of Maltese origin. People with this surname include:

People
Charles J. Scicluna (born 1959), Roman Catholic prelate
Edward Scicluna (born 1946), Maltese politician and a Member of the European Parliament
Kenneth Scicluna (born 1979), Maltese professional footballer
Mikel Scicluna (1929–2010), Maltese professional wrestler
Martin Scicluna (footballer) (born 1960), Maltese footballer
Martin Scicluna (businessman), British businessman

Other uses
Palazzo Parisio (Naxxar), Palazzo Parisio in Naxxar, Malta